Arto Records was a record company and label that operated from 1920 to 1923.

Arto was owned by the Standard Music Roll Company in Orange, New Jersey. The recording studio was located in New York City. Arto was one of the first labels to issue releases of vaudeville blues musicians. It also issued Lucille Hegamin and the Original Memphis Five.

Arto issued a Black Label series of popular music including such artists as The California Ramblers and Vernon Dalhart, and a Red Label series of classical and ethnic music that included the Peerless Quartet and Fred Van Eps.

Arto pressed masters for other record companies, including Nordskog Records for Kid Ory's band, the first black band from New Orleans to be recorded, and Arto's sister company Bell Records. The label licensed masters from other companies, particularly for release on the Red Label series.

See also 
 List of record labels

References

Further reading
 American Record Label Book, Brian Rust, Da Capo, 1984.

American record labels
Record labels established in 1920
Record labels disestablished in 1923
Jazz record labels